Kshipra Joshi (born 1994, in Mumbai) is a former Indian rhythmic gymnast who competed in the 2010 World Gymnastics Championships as well as in the 2010 commonwealth games for India. Kshipra now a coach at Premier rhythmic gymnastics academy. She is also recognised as an International level judge by the International Gymnastics Federation. She made and holds a Guinness World Record for 18 rotations in a '180-degree balance position' in one minute, the record was made on 21 March 2011 on the set of Guinness World Records - Ab India Todega in Mumbai. She was awarded the "Shiv Chhatrapati Krida Puraskar" in March 2011 by the Government of Maharashtra.

Education

Kshipra Joshi received her secondary education from the Balmohan Vidyamandir, located in Shivaji Park. Followed by a Bachelor of Arts degree in History from Ramnarain Ruia College, Mumbai. She decided to further follow her passion in sports by pursuing a post graduate diploma in sports management from the International Institute of Sports Management, Mumbai.

See also 
Akshata Shete—confrère 
Spruha Joshi—elder sister

References

Further reading

19-member squad for gymnastics announced (2 September 2010). The Indian Express. Retrieved 3 October 2017.
Pooja Surve Akshata Shete and Kshipra Joshi performing Rhythmic Gymnastics (9 September 2010). Mid-Day. Retrieved 3 October 2017.
Gymnast Girls from Mumbai Gear Up for CWG! (9 September 2010). idiva.com. Retrieved 3 October 2017.
Naik, Shivani (17 September 2010). Rhythm blues. The Indian Express. Retrieved 3 October 2017.
Turner, Amanda (22 September 2010). Russia Extends Lead at Rhythmic Worlds. International Gymnast Magazine. Retrieved 3 October 2017.
Rhythmic gymnastics from today (11 October 2010). The Hindu. Retrieved 3 October 2017.
National Games: Gymnasts, Khade propels Maharashtra to top in medal tally (17 March 2011). NDTV. Retrieved 3 October 2017.
Thakur, Arun Kumar (February 2011). 8th gold walks home: Borrowed boy brings glory with endurance. The Telegraph (Calcutta). Retrieved 3 October 2017.
National Games: Gold medal eludes State (18 February 2011). The Sangai Express. Retrieved 3 October 2017.
Letter (1 November 2013). University of Mumbai. Retrieved 3 October 2017.
Article (20 June 2017). Loksatta. (Marathi). Retrieved 3 October 2017.

1994 births
Living people
Sportspeople from Mumbai
Indian rhythmic gymnasts
Guinness World Records